S. M. Mohsin (30 January 1948 – 18 April 2021) was a Bangladeshi stage and television actor. He became an honorary fellow of the Bangla Academy in 2018. In 2020, he was awarded Ekushey Padak by the Government of Bangladesh for his contribution to acting.

Education and career
Mohsin originated from Tangail District. He completed his bachelor's in Bangla and journalism  from the University of Dhaka.

Mohsin worked as a faculty member of Drama and Dramatics Department at Jahangirnagar University, an acting director general of Bangladesh Shilpakala Academy and the first project director of National Theatre.

Mohsin acted in Roktey Bheja Shapla, a play directed by Atiqul Haque Chowdhury, and Kobor and Chithi by Munier Chowdhury. He debuted his first radio play in Padakkhep.

Mohsin performed with the theatre troupe Drama Circle.

Works
Theatre plays
 Dipantor
 Kobor
 Subochon Nirbashon
 Chup Adalat Cholchhey

Television serial plays
 Mohor Ali
 Sakin Sarisuri
 Gorom Bhat Othoba Nichhok Bhuter Golpo
 Nilambori

Films
 Agamikal (2022)

Awards
 Meril Prothom Alo Award for Best Television Actor (2007)
 Shilpakala Padak (2017)
 Bangla Academy Fellowship (2018)
 Ekushey Padak (2020)

Personal life
Mohsin had two sons - Rezwan Mohsin and Rashek Mohsin.

Mohsin died on 18 April 2021, of complications from COVID-19, at BIRDEM hospital.

References

External links

2021 deaths
Place of birth missing
1948 births
People from Tangail District
University of Dhaka alumni
Academic staff of Jahangirnagar University
Bangladeshi male stage actors
Bangladeshi male television actors
Honorary Fellows of Bangla Academy
Recipients of the Ekushey Padak
Deaths from the COVID-19 pandemic in Bangladesh